Saviola is a surname. Notable people with the surname include:

 Camille Saviola (1950–2021), Italian-American actress and singer
 Javier Saviola (born 1981), Argentinian footballer
 Marilyn Saviola (1945-2019), American disability rights activist
  Tuedor Saviola (born 1992), 
Nigerian writer